The Margraviate of Landsberg was a march of the Holy Roman Empire that existed from the 13th to the 14th century under the rule of the Wettin dynasty. It was named after Landsberg Castle in present-day Saxony-Anhalt.

Geography
The territory located in the historic Osterland region comprised the westernmost part of the March of Lusatia (Saxon Eastern March) between the rivers Saale and Mulde. It comprised the margravial fortress of Landsberg and the nearby town of Delitzsch, as well as the adjacent Leipzig area formerly part of the Margraviate of Meissen. It stretched down to the former County of Groitzsch in the south, and up to Sangerhausen in the west, including the town of Weißenfels which became the margravial residence. It also comprised the castle of Grimma and the former Pleissnerland town of Zwickau.

History

Upon the death of Margrave Conrad in 1156, the Wettin domains of Meissen and Lusatia were re-arranged. Conrad's younger son Margrave Theodoric I of Lusatia had Landsberg Castle erected until 1174 and began to style himself a "Margrave of Landsberg".

However, an Imperial State in its own right was not established until in 1261, when Margrave Henry the Illustrious (against legal provisions) split off the western Landsberg territory from the March of Lusatia as a separate margraviate for his second son Theodoric. After Dietrich's son Frederick Tuta had died without male heirs in 1291, his uncle Margrave Albert II of Meissen sold it to the Ascanian margrave Otto IV of Brandenburg.

In 1327 the Welf duke Magnus I of Brunswick-Lüneburg inherited Landsberg by marrying Sophia of Brandenburg-Stendal, the sister of the last Ascanian margrave Henry II and also the niece of the German king Louis IV, who had seized the Brandenburg possessions in 1320. Duke Magnus sold Landsberg to Margrave Frederick II of Meissen in 1347, and in this way the former margraviate finally fell back to the House of Wettin.

Margraves

House of Wettin
 Theodoric, 1265–1285, son of Margrave Henry the Illustrious
 Frederick Tuta, 1285–1291, son, also Margrave of Lusatia from 1288
Fell to Albert II, Margrave of Meissen, sold to Brandenburg

House of Ascania
1291-1298: Conrad, Otto IV of the Arrow, Henry I Lackland, Otto V the Tall, Albert III
1298-1300: Conrad, Otto IV of the Arrow, Henry I Lackland, Albert III, Herman I the Tall
1300-1304: Conrad, Otto IV of the Arrow, Henry I Lackland, Herman I the Tall
1304-1308: Otto IV of the Arrow, Henry I Lackland, Herman I the Tall
1308-1317: Henry I Lackland, Valdemar I the Great, John V the Illustrious
1317-1319: Valdemar I the Great
1319-1320: Henry II the Child
1320-1347: Sophia, married to:

House of Welf
1327-1347: Magnus I, Duke of Brunswick-Lüneburg, 1327-1347, by marriage to Sophia of Brandenburg-Stendal
Sold to Meissen.

References
 At Meyers Konversationslexikon, 1888
 At Zedlers Universal-Lexicon, vol. 16, p. 238

Landsber
1260s establishments in the Holy Roman Empire
1261 establishments in Europe
1340s disestablishments in the Holy Roman Empire
1347 disestablishments in Europe
Landsberg
States and territories established in 1156